In Hindu astronomy, Jyotirmimamsa (analysis of astronomy) is a treatise on the methodology of astronomical studies authored by Nilakantha Somayaji (1444–1544) in around 1504 CE. Nilakantha somayaji was an important astronomer-mathematician of the Kerala school of astronomy and mathematics and was the author of the much celebrated astronomical work titled Tantrasamgraha. This book stresses the necessity and importance of astronomical observations to obtain correct parameters for computations and to develop more and more accurate theories. It even discounts the role of revealed wisdom and divine intuitions in studying astronomical phenomena. Jyotirmimamsa is sometimes cited as proof to establish that modern methodologies of scientific investigations were known to ancient and medieval Indians. Neelkantha Somayaji insisted that computational results should tally with that of observations and astronomical parameters and constants should be revised periodically. To come to more precise conclusions, Neelkantha Somayaji have discussions with the astronomer and mathematicians of other schools.  

The nature of the astronomical and mathematical work, the divine intuition, the experimental details of the science, corrections to the planetary parameters, reasons for the corrections for the planetary revolutions, Vedic authority for inference in astronomy, relative accuracy of different systems, and correction through eclipses, true motion, position, etc., of planets are some of the topics discussed in Jyotirmimamsa.

Synopsis
The following is an outline of the various topics discussed in Jyotirmimamsa.

The necessity of revising the astronomical constants at regular intervals for correcting the parameters connected with astronomy
The meaning of devatha prasada, which is manifested in the intuition of the astronomers, as a prerequisite for obtaining the accurate values and the correct approach in the astronomy
The experimental determinations of the astronomical constants and the tools used for these determinations
The need and the importance of conducting experiments in astronomical studies
Significance of the astronomical books and the base of collecting data from those books
Application of corrections, called bija correction, for the astronomical figures 
The corrections known as the Bhatta correction 
Justification of the changes made by the astronomer Lallacharya in his book Sishyaddhi vruddhi tantra
Reasons for difference in the mean planets though the revolutions are identical
Vedic authority for inference as a means to derive the number of planetary revolutions
Different systems of astronomy
The numbers of planetary revolutions enunciated by Sripati and Brahmagupta
The numbers of revolutions of planets, apogees and nodes, number of days, in a Kalpa (in astronomy, a period of 14×72×4320000 years) 
Zero points of the planets at the commencement of Kali Yuga, corrections to planetary revolutions
Relative accuracy of the different astronomical systems
Mean planets according to the Sunrise system of Aryabhatiya, mean planets, Moon's apogee and Moon's node according to Siddhantasekhara
Application of the values in the astronomical calculations, astronomical corrections given on the bases of the eclipses
Eclipses observed by Parameswaracharya
Method of corrections given by other astronomers
Demonstration of the validity of those corrections through eclipses, precision of equinoxes, calculation and the correction, correction of the periphery of the manda epicycle, discussion on the precision of the equinoxes, corrections due to the precession of the equinoxes
Sine table for praanakalaantara, sine table for the ascensional differences
Derivation of the 36 Rsines
Graphic proof for the relation of the sides and hypotenuse
Reason for the reduction of the minutes of arc of the planetary orbital to the visible celestial sphere

See also
Indian astronomy
Indian mathematics
Indian mathematicians
History of mathematics

References

Hindu astronomy
History of mathematics
Kerala school of astronomy and mathematics
Indian astronomy texts